Standing Boy Creek State Park is a  Georgia state park located in Columbus. The executive order creating the park was issued by then-Governor Sonny Perdue on January 21, 2004.

Attractions
Attractions in the park include swimming, boating (on Lake Oliver), hiking, and hunting.

References
 Standing Boy Creek State Park Georgia Executive Order by Sonny Perdue, January 21, 2004. Retrieved 08 November 2009.

External links
 Standing Boy Creek State Park

State parks of Georgia (U.S. state)
Protected areas of Muscogee County, Georgia
Geography of Columbus, Georgia
Protected areas established in 2004
Tourist attractions in Columbus, Georgia
2004 establishments in Georgia (U.S. state)